There are at least 73 members of the Scrophulariales order, Scrophulariales, found in Montana. Some of these species are exotics (not native to Montana) and some species have been designated as Species of Concern.

Bladderwort
Family: Lentibulariaceae
Pinguicula macroceras, California butterwort
Utricularia intermedia, flat-leaved bladderwort
Utricularia macrorhiza, greater bladderwort
Utricularia minor, lesser bladderwort

Bloomrape

Family: Orobanchaceae

Castilleja angustifolia, desert Indian paintbrush
Castilleja cervina, deer Indian paintbrush
Castilleja covilleana, Coville Indian paintbrush
Castilleja crista-galli, greater red Indian paintbrush
Castilleja cusickii, Cusick's Indian paintbrush
Castilleja exilis, annual Indian paintbrush
Castilleja flava, yellow Indian paintbrush
Castilleja flava var. flava, yellow Indian paintbrush
Castilleja flava var. rustica, rustic Indian paintbrush
Castilleja gracillima, slender Indian paintbrush
Castilleja hispida, harsh Indian paintbrush
Castilleja linariifolia, Wyoming Indian paintbrush
Castilleja lutescens, stiff yellowish Indian paintbrush
Castilleja miniata, greater red Indian paintbrush
Castilleja nivea, snow Indian paintbrush
Castilleja occidentalis, western Indian paintbrush
Castilleja pallescens, pallid Indian paintbrush
Castilleja pilosa, parrot-head Indian paintbrush
Castilleja pilosa var. longispica, parrot-head Indian paintbrush
Castilleja pulchella, showy Indian paintbrush
Castilleja rhexiifolia, rhexia-leaf Indian paintbrush
Castilleja sessiliflora, downy Indian paintbrush
Castilleja sulphurea, sulphur Indian paintbrush
Cordylanthus capitatus, Yakima bird's-beak
Cordylanthus ramosus, much-branded birds-beak
Euphrasia subarctica, arctic eyebright
Melampyrum lineare, American cow-wheat
Orobanche corymbosa, flat-topped broomrape
Orobanche fasciculata, clustered broomrape
Orobanche ludoviciana, Louisiana broomrape
Orobanche uniflora, one-flowered broomrape
Orthocarpus luteus, yellow owl's-clover
Orthocarpus tenuifolius, thin-leaved owl's-clover
Orthocarpus tolmiei, Tolmie's owl's-clover
Pedicularis bracteosa, bracted lousewort
Pedicularis bracteosa var. bracteosa, bracted lousewort
Pedicularis bracteosa var. canbyi, Canby's lousewort
Pedicularis bracteosa var. paysoniana, Payson's lousewort
Pedicularis contorta var. contorta, coiled lousewort
Pedicularis contorta, curve-beak lousewort
Pedicularis contorta var. ctenophora, pink coil-beaked lousewort
Pedicularis contorta var. rubicunda, Selway coil-beaked lousewort
Pedicularis crenulata, scallop-leaf lousewort
Pedicularis cystopteridifolia, fern-leaved lousewort
Pedicularis groenlandica, elephant's-head lousewort
Pedicularis oederi, Oeder's lousewort
Pedicularis parryi, Parry's lousewort
Pedicularis pulchella, mountain lousewort
Pedicularis racemosa, leafy lousewort
Rhinanthus minor, little yellow-rattle

Figwort

Family: Scrophulariaceae

Mimulus ampliatus, stalk-leaved monkeyflower
Mimulus breviflorus, short-flowered monkeyflower
Mimulus breweri, Brewer's monkeyflower
Mimulus clivicola, North Idaho monkeyflower
Mimulus floribundus, floriferous monkeyflower
Mimulus glabratus, roundleaf monkeyflower
Mimulus guttatus, common large monkeyflower
Mimulus hymenophyllus, thinsepal monkeyflower
Mimulus lewisii, Lewis' monkeyflower
Mimulus moschatus, muskflower
Mimulus nanus, dwarf purple monkeyflower
Mimulus primuloides, primrose monkeyflower
Mimulus ringens, square-stem monkeyflower
Mimulus suksdorfii, Suksdorf monkeyflower
Mimulus tilingii, subalpine monkeyflower
Scrophularia lanceolata, hare figwort
Verbascum blattaria, white moth mullein
Verbascum thapsus, common mullein

Olive

Family: Oleaceae
Fraxinus pennsylvanica, green ash

Further reading

See also
 List of dicotyledons of Montana

Notes

Montana